Alexandru Dionisie Vlasie (born 28 February 1990) is a Romanian professional footballer who plays as a goalkeeper.

References

External links
 
 

1990 births
Living people
Sportspeople from Galați
Romanian footballers
Association football goalkeepers
Liga I players
Liga II players
FCM Dunărea Galați players
ASC Oțelul Galați players
FC Delta Dobrogea Tulcea players